The first election to Lothian Regional Council was held on 7 May 1974 and saw Labour emerging as the largest party on the council, although falling just shy of a majority.

Aggregate results

Ward results

Armadale

Bathgate

Whitburn

Calders

Linlithgow/Uphall

Broxburn

Livingston

Holyrood/Meadows

Lochrin/Tron

Dalry/Tynecastle

Moat/Polwarth

Church Hill/Braid

Sciennes/Marchmont

Prestonfield/Mayfield

Inch/Gilmerton

Alnwickhill/Kaimes

Merchiston/Colinton

Fairmilehead/Firrhill

Sighthill/Stenhouse

Slateford/Hailes

Pilton/Muirhouse

Craigsbank/Carrickknowe

Corstorphine/Drumbrae

Murrayfield/Blackhall

Cramond/Barnton

Drylaw/Comely Bank

Dean/St. Andrews

Pilrig/Calton

Broughton/Inverlieth

Royston/Granton

Trinity/Newhaven

Harbour/Bonnington

Links/Lorne

Willowbrae/Craigentinny

Jocks' Lodge/Portobello

Duddingston/Milton

Niddrie/Craigmillar

References

1974 Scottish local elections
1974